Arcenciel (stylised as arcenciel), is a Lebanese non-profit, apolitical and non-confessional NGO created in response to the Lebanese civil war in 1985. It participates in sustainable development and was recognized as a public utility in 1995 by the Lebanese Presidential Decree N⁰7541.

Arcenciel’s main goal is to work with and support people living with disabilities or other physical and psychological difficulties. In 1994, arcenciel created the division “Acces et Droit” ('Rights and Access') within the Ministry of Social Affairs It does that within the framework of 5 core programs, each designed to help Arcenciel to actively participate in Lebanon’s sustainable development.

Core programs

Agriculture and environment
With a plot of land 2.3km2 in size at Domain do Taanayel, managed by arcenciel, arcenciel is able to work on innovating new techniques for organic farming, saving energy and water for the benefit of present and future generations.
Arcenciel is the only NGO in Lebanon that treats hazardous hospital waste; 90% of hospitals in Lebanon collaborate with arcenciel within this project.

Mobility and health
Mobility and Health participates in the social reintegration of people in need,
focusing on those living with disabilities.
It supports people through their entire recovery process by providing diverse health consultations, distributing mobility equipment and adapting living spaces.
In 1994, Mobility and Health created the division “Accès et Droit” within the Ministry of Social Affairs. The division single-handedly passed governmental policy, Law 220, that financially and socially protects all Lebanese disabled people.

Social support
This program aims to support and help the community on the ground by identifying the difficulties and needs they are struggling with.  It runs an employment office, which acts as a social support system and comprises a network of clothing and furniture boutiques focused on integrating people back into society.

Tourism
The ecolodge, Khan el Maksoud and Domaine de Taanayel have become part of the Lebanese tourism landscape by offering an experience of traditional, rural living with accommodation, restaurants and adventurous activities while protecting Lebanese heritage and the country’s natural resources.

Youth empowerment
Youth Support helps at risk youth develop their emotional, social and psychological capacities.
Through the rainbow club network that spreads throughout arcenciel centers, the program offers a wide range of activities, essential to youth empowerment: sports and recreation, arts and culture, education.
Established in 2001, cirquenciel became the first circus school in Lebanon and the Middle east. It promotes intercultural dialogue and help at risk youths reintegrate educational and professional paths.

Arcenciel USA
Arcenciel USA, is a nonprofit organization providing a bridge for US based individuals, institutions, and corporations to connect with and support Lebanon’s most underprivileged and marginalized communities, regardless of religion, political affiliation or nationality. Through fundraising efforts and additional programs, arcenciel USA supports at risk communities in Lebanonby focusing on youth empowerment, mobility and health, sustainable agriculture and environment, responsible tourism and social support.

Arcenciel France
Arcenciel France consults and recruits for Lebanon through academic and professional trainings. Teachers and trainers specialized in social entrepreneurship help guide enterprise and sustainable development in the broader Mediterranean region.
Processmed supports social entrepreneurship in the Mediterranean and provides the opportunity for French, Tunisians, Lebanese students and social entrepreneurs to collaborate in Tunis, Beyrouth and Lyon on strategic development
and business development.

References

Organizations established in 1985
Non-profit organisations based in Lebanon
1985 establishments in Lebanon